MTV Pinoy (formerly MTV Philippines) was a Philippine music and entertainment pay television network owned by Viacom International Media Networks Asia (a division of Viacom International Media Networks), with a partnership with Viva Entertainment to collaborate on local productions, events, marketing and advertising sales. The network was launched on February 1, 2014. It operated from 4pm to 1am, after that it would rebroadcast MTV Asia's programming.

On December 1, 2014, MTV Pinoy launched new shows and it became a 24-hour channel. By that time, only live events and specials and a few of its programs were still simulcast from MTV Asia. However, on January 1, 2017, the channel was closed down and replaced by MTV Southeast Asia. This was possibly due to Viacom switching partnerships from Viva to rival company Solar Entertainment, as well as the intense competition from ABS-CBN's music network, Myx. OPM related programs from MTV Pinoy were transferred to Viva TV. Only MTV Pinoy Pop and some local advertising remained in the network until March 6, 2017.

Background

History

Prior to its relaunch, it was first known as MTV Philippines and was a corporate venture between MTV Networks Asia and Nation Broadcasting Corporation, then transferred to a new partnership with All Youth Channels, Inc. which began on March 1, 2007. Its broadcast started in May 1992, with MTV Networks Asia providing much of the broadcast content, and NBC provided the infrastructure. The network was once located at The Fort in Fort Bonifacio, Taguig and at Silver City in Frontera Verde, Ortigas Avenue, Pasig. The channel was closed down on February 16, 2010, when Francis Lumen, the president and CEO of All Youth Channels Inc., decided not to renew the contract for the network's broadcast extension. Its shutdown started with the music video played 11 minutes before midnight, "Video Killed the Radio Star" by The Buggles, which was the very first music video ever played at the launch of MTV in the United States on August 1, 1981. After the closure, it reverted to its original channel, MTV Southeast Asia, and MTV in the Philippines remained on hiatus.

Formation
Prior to the return of MTV to the Philippines, executive vice president and managing director of Viacom International Media Networks Asia Indra Suharjono decided to bring back the channel almost after a four-year hiatus since 2010. She stated that ever since she made channels such as Nickelodeon, Comedy Central, and specifically MTV Live HD available in the country, she sought to launch MTV again for the sake of young Philippine people and the importance of their local music industry.

On November 5, 2013, it was announced that VIMN Asia was looking for partnership for the re-launch. Suharjono asked first to make amends for agreement to VIVA Entertainment founder Vic del Rosario Jr., but later confirmed that VIVA would partner with MTV to collaborate on local production, on-ground events, marketing and advertising sales.  After finding a new partnership in Viva Communications, the new channel made a major overhaul, and was reintroduced to the country as MTV Pinoy.

On February 14, 2014, at 4pm, MTV Pinoy was launched with its first program, MTV Halo-Halo with VJ Sam. "Dear Lonely" performed by Zia Quizon was the first music video aired on the channel. In February 2016, MTV Pinoy's MTV Top 20 Pilipinas, hosted by VJ Aryanna, started airing every Saturday nights on TV5. This happened after the appointment of Vic del Rosario's as the network's chief entertainment strategist and followed by Viva takes over the dissolved TV5's main  Entertainment department, However, in September 2016, MTV Top 20 Pilipinas on TV5 was cancelled as former Gilas Pilipinas and PBA head coach, Chot Reyes took over as president of TV5 (until Reyes resigned in June 2019).

MTV Pinoy has extended its coverage to over 1.22 million Filipino households all over the country since its initial broadcast.

MTV Halo-Halo
MTV Halo-Halo was a Philippine music video television program owned by MTV Pinoy. The show, which played OPM (original Pilipino music) and international music, was launched on February 14, 2014, jointly with MTV Pinoy.

On December 1, 2014, as part of the all-new MTV Pinoy line-up, they also launched a spin-off called MTV Halo-Halo Hits which played hit songs continuously with no VJs. On December 31, 2016, MTV Halo-Halo ended its final broadcast, along with the entirety of MTV Pinoy, and was reverted to MTV Southeast Asia.

MTV Pinoy's Past VJs
The new VJs have been introduced in this new MTV format. All of them are talents of Viva.

 VJ Andre (André Paras)
 VJ Aryanna (Aryanna Epperson) 
 VJ Josh (Josh Padilla)
 VJ Katarina (Katarina Rodríguez)
 VJ Kito (Kito Romuáldez)
 VJ Sam (Sam Pinto)
 VJ Schneider (Chris Schneider)
 VJ Shy (Shy Carlos) 
 VJ Yassi (Yassi Pressman)

Programs

Awkward
Are You the One?
Catfish: The TV Show
Car Crash Couples
Disaster Date
House Of Food
Hangout with Donnalyn
MTV Halo-Halo
MTV Europe Music Awards
MTV Hits
MTV Hashtags
MTV Idol
MTV Ko
Pretty Little Liars
Punk'd
MTV Movie Awards
MTV Pwesto
MTV Sing
MTV Today's Top 10
MTV Top 5 Countdown (moved to TV3)
MTV Top 10 International
MTV Top 10 Pilipinas
MTV Top 20 International
MTV Top 20 Pilipinas (also aired on TV5)
MTV Video Music Awards
MTV World Stage
OK Pop
The OPM Show
Pinoy Beats
Pinoy Pop
Playlist
Rock On Pinas!
Ridiculousness
Senti
ShoutOut
Throwback
The MTV Show
Usavich
VH1 Hits

See also
Viacom
Viva Entertainment
Channel V Philippines
MTV Philippines
MTV Southeast Asia
MTVph
myx

References

External links

MTV channels
Defunct television networks in the Philippines
Viva Entertainment
Television networks in the Philippines
Television channels and stations established in 2014
Television channels and stations disestablished in 2016
2014 establishments in the Philippines
Music video networks in the Philippines